Chris Weaver Band sometimes referred to as CWB is an Americana/Rock band headlining the singer Chris Weaver. Based in Nashville, the band's music sound incorporates influences from rock, blues, R&B, Mo-Town and in general Americana music. The band released their albums Standing in Line in 2010 and American Dreamer in 2015. 

Chris Weaver born in West Virginia started with a short stint in local radio, before moving to Nashville and touring with his band eventually performing at two of the best live music spots in Nashville  The Stage on Broadway and the Tin Roof. His music, live performances and radio support helped propel him to being named as "Top 10 act to follow in 2013" by Billboard. His song "California High" was used in soundtrack of the 2013 motion picture A Matter of Time. 

The band has acquired great following in Brazil where Chris Weaver band has cooperated with sertanejo stars in Brazil including Fernando & Sorocaba, its lead singer Fernando Zor⁠⁠⁠⁠ and with Marcos & Belutti resulting in a live album and DVD Live in Brazil in 2017.

With the help of Go West Productions the Chris Weaver Band has traveled all over the country performing for major corporations: Sonic, PETCO, PSCU, Highmark Health just to name a few allowing them to open for numerous acts such as John Mellencamp, Earth Wind and Fire, Chicago, and Heart.

Members
Starting members
Chris Weaver - lead vocals, guitar 
Cornelius "Corn" Perry - bass
Josh Waters - guitar
Ben Owens - guitar
Matt "Ice" Iceman - drums
Kaid Doyle - guitar
Eric Kenny - keys
Reed Pitman - keys

Current members
Chris Weaver - lead vocals, guitar 
Darrin Favorite - Guitar
Andy Leab - Bass
Jason Friedman - Keyboards
Joe Douglas - Saxophone
Casey Brefka - Trumpet
Tyler Parkey - Drums

Discography

Albums
2010: Standing in Line
2015: American Dreamer
2017: Live in Brazil (also as DVD)
2019: ''(New album to be released)

Singles
2012: "Time Has Wings"
2013: "Raise the Dead"

References

External links
Official website
Facebook

American musical groups